Gerald O'Sullivan may refer to:

Gerald O'Sullivan (judge) (1891–1960), Australian judge, acting Judge on the New South Wales Supreme Court
Gerald Robert O'Sullivan (1888–1915), Irish soldier in the British Army and recipient of the Victoria Cross
Gearóid O'Sullivan (1891–1948), Irish teacher, army officer, barrister and Sinn Féin and Fine Gael politician.
Gerald O'Sullivan (Lieutenant-General) Irish Defence Forces Chief of Staff 1984-1986

See also
Gerry O'Sullivan, Irish politician
Gerry O'Sullivan (media)
Jerry O'Sullivan (disambiguation)